The enzyme(R)-2-methylmalate dehydratase catalyzes the chemical reaction

(R)-2-methylmalate  2-methylmaleate + HO

This enzyme belongs to the family of lyases, specifically the hydro-lyases, which cleave carbon-oxygen bonds. The systematic name of this enzyme class is {{chem name|(R)-2-methylmalate hydro-lyase (2-methylmaleate-forming)}}. This enzyme participates in valine, leucine and isoleucine biosynthesis and c5-branched dibasic acid metabolism. It employs one cofactor, iron.

References

 

EC 4.2.1
Iron enzymes
Enzymes of unknown structure